Blade battery is a type of lithium iron phosphate (LFP) battery for electric vehicles designed and manufactured by FinDreams Battery, a subsidiary of Chinese manufacturing company BYD.

The Blade Battery is most commonly a 96 cm long and 9 cm wide single-cell battery with a special design, which can be placed in an array and inserted into a battery pack like a blade. It is made in various lengths and thicknesses. The space utilization of the battery pack is increased by over 50% compared to most conventional lithium iron phosphate block batteries. The driving range of some electric vehicles equipped with Blade Battery can reach more than 600 kilometers.

In the nail penetration test, the battery industry's stringent safety test, the Blade Battery emitted no smoke or fire after being penetrated, and its surface temperature reached only 30 to 60 °C. It is currently the only power battery in the world that can safely pass the test. In addition, it successfully passed an extreme safety test that saw it being rolled over by a 46-ton heavy-duty truck. The Blade Battery also passed other extreme test conditions, such as being crushed, bent, being heated in a furnace to 300 °C and overcharged by 260%. None of these resulted in a fire or explosion.

The Blade Battery was officially launched by BYD in 2020. Compared with ternary lithium batteries and traditional lithium iron phosphate batteries, it holds notable advantages in its high safety, long range, enduring longevity, ultra strength and high power. To address users' concerns about the safety of EV power batteries, BYD will only use the Blade Battery in all its pure electric passenger vehicles since July 2021.

Safety controversies 
BYD claims that "EVs equipped with the Blade Battery would be far less susceptible to catching fire – even when they are severely damaged."

However, In July 2021, a BYD Han EV with Blade batteries was crash-tested in China (car-to-car crash test) versus an Arcfox Alpha-S. At about 48 hours after the test, nothing happened to the Arcfox Alpha-S, only the BYD Han car caught fire and burned to the ground. On November 15, 2021, a BYD Tang EV (with Blade batteries) caught fire in a workshop in Kristiansand, Norway.

References

Lithium-ion batteries
BYD Company